Hullin or Chullin (lit. "Ordinary" or "Mundane") is the third tractate of the Mishnah in the Order of Kodashim and deals with the laws of ritual slaughter of animals and birds for meat in ordinary or non-consecrated use (as opposed to sacred use), and with the Jewish dietary laws in general, such as the laws governing the prohibition of mixing of meat (fleishig) and dairy (milchig) products.

While it is included in the Seder Kodashim, it mainly discusses non-consecrated things and things used as the ordinary human food, particularly meats; it is therefore sometimes called "Shehitat Hullin" ("Slaughtering of Non-Consecrated Animals"). It comprises twelve chapters, dealing with the laws for the slaughtering of animals and birds for meat for ordinary as opposed to sacred use, with other rules relating to the eating of meat, and with the dietary laws in general.

The rules prescribed for kosher slaughtering, known as Shechita, include five things which must be avoided: there must be no delay; no pressure may be exerted on the knife's moving backwards and forwards; the knife must not be allowed to slip beyond a certain area of throat; there must be no thrusting of the knife under the skin or between the gullet and windpipe; the gullet or windpipe must not be torn out of position in the course of slaughtering.

Mishnah
The contents of the Mishnah's twelve chapters may be summarized as follows:

 When, and by whom, an animal must be killed to be ritually fit for food; the instrument with which the killing must be done; the space within which the incision must be made, and the exceeding of which renders the animal "terefah." Incidentally, it discusses the differences between shechitah and melikah (pinching off the heads of birds brought as sacrifices; see), and the various degrees in which different vessels are susceptible to impurity.
 The organs that must be severed: in quadrupeds, the trachea and the gullet, or the greater part of each, must be cut through; in fowls, cutting through one of these organs, or the greater part of one, suffices. In both cases the jugular vein must be severed. Rules as to the character of the incision follow. Then comes a series of rules regarding animals killed in honor of foreign deities or of deified natural objects: regarding the localities where the formal killing of an animal might create a suspicion of idolatry; regarding the prohibition against using as ordinary food the flesh of animals killed for sacred purposes.
 Animals injured by disease, accident, or animal attack. The Mishnah enumerates eighteen diseases and injuries which render an animal terefah, including perforations of the lungs or of the small intestines, and fractures of the spine or of the ribs. It also cites diseases and injuries that do not render the animal terefah, and concludes by listing the signs of kosher animals.
 Embryos, living or dead, found in a slaughtered female animal; on the Caesarian section.
 The prohibition against slaughtering an animal and its offspring on the same day. If both animals have been consecrated and killed within the Temple precincts, the animal first killed may be used, but not the second; the killer of the second is subject to kareth (cutting off, excision). If neither animal has been consecrated and both have been killed beyond the sacred precincts, the flesh of both may be used for food; but the killer of the second is subject to lashes. To prevent an unwitting violation of this prohibition, the cattle-dealer is required to notify the purchaser of the sale of the mother or the offspring for the meat-market. This notice must be given whenever meat is in greater demand than usual, as on the eve of a festival.
 The duty to cover the blood of ritually killed wild animals or birds, and the material with which it should be covered. This applies only to the blood of animals which, after being slaughtered, are found to be kosher, and only when the killing has been done on legitimate ground.
 The prohibition against eating the Gid hanasheh, which is always and everywhere in force, and which extends to consecrated and unconsecrated animals, and to the live young found in a slaughtered mother.
 The prohibition against mixing milk and meat; "meat" includes any animal flesh except fish and locust. As a rabbinic addition, meat and milk should not be placed near each other on the dining-table.
 Carcasses and reptiles that communicate impurity by contact; pieces from different parts of a "nebelah" (piece of carrion) are considered as one piece, and if they are collectively of sufficient bulk they render impure any food with which they come in contact. For example, a piece of skin and a piece of bone or sinew, if together equaling an olive in size, render food otherwise pure to be impure.
 The parts of every ritually killed animal which the layman must give to the priest (Foreleg, cheeks and maw), and the rules concerning injured animals that should be presented to the priest or should be redeemed.
 The duty of surrendering to the priest the first-fruit of the sheep-shearing; the differences between this duty and that treated in the preceding chapter; the number of sheep one must possess before this law comes into force; the circumstances under which one is exempt.
 The law of Shiluach haken. This law applies only when the mother bird is actually in the nest with her young, and when the birds are nesting in the open, where they can easily escape. Non-kosher birds and "Herodian" birds (=birds produced by mating different species, said to have been practised by Herod) are not included in this law.

Tosefta
The Tosefta and the Mishnah correspond in the first seven chapters. Chapter 8 Tosefta corresponds to chapters 8-9 Mishnah; chapter 9 to chapter 10; and 10 to 11-12. On the other hand, the Tosefta is more prolix than its older sister compilation, and sometimes cites episodes from the lives of great men in connection with the subject-matter. Thus, speaking of the forbidding of meat prepared for idolatrous purposes, it quotes the reports of Eleazar b. Dama's last illness and alleged apostasy (see Ben Dama; Eliezer Ben Hyrcanus).

Talmud
The Mishnah of Hullin is but rarely cited in the Jerusalem Talmud; in fact, only 15 of the 75 mishnayot from the treatise are quoted in the entire Jerusalem Talmud. This is not so in the Babylonian Gemara, which discusses and explains every section of the Mishnah and also much of the Tosefta. It affords a clear insight into the main object of the provisions of this treatise—the prevention of cruelty and pain, and the draining of every drop of blood from the body in order to render the flesh wholesome.

An example of the humanitarian motive of this treatise. Samuel of Nehardea established the following rule: "When the tabach [butcher] is not familiar with the regulations concerning shechitah, one must not eat anything slaughtered by him". Samuel summed up the laws of shechita in the following five mishnaic words: "shehiyyah" (delaying), "derasah" (chopping), "chaladah" (sticking the knife in under the veins), "hagramah" (cutting in another than the proper part of the animal), and "ikkur" (tearing; Hullin 1:2; 2:3,4), against all of which one must guard himself.

As in other tractates, halakhic discussions are interspersed with instructive and entertaining aggadot. In a statement of the marks by which kosher are distinguished from non-kosher animals, a unicorn is mentioned, and is said to be the gazelle of Bei-Ilai. The mention of the latter suggests the "lion of Bei-Ilai," and thereupon the compiler proceeds to tell an elaborate story of Caesar (the emperor) and Joshua ben Hananiah (59b et seq.).

References

External links
 Hullin Jewish Virtual Library
 Full text of the Mishnah for tractate Hullin on Sefaria (Hebrew and English)